"You and Me" is a song by singer songwriter Joan Franka.  It was chosen to represent the Netherlands in the Eurovision Song Contest 2012. The song was released in the Netherlands as a Digital download on 27 February 2012. Franka wrote and composed the song together with Jessica Hoogenboom (artist name Jessie Maria).

Within the first week after the release of You And Me, on 2 March 2012, the single got in on place #1 of the Dutch Single Top 100.

Background 

On 26 February 2012, Joan Franka performed "You and Me" at the Nationaal Songfestival, wearing a Native American headdress designed by Nicoline van Marle. The background for her suit comes from the origin of the text of her song. That is about an innocent young love of herself when she was five years old and playing 'Indians' with her little boyfriend.  In her performance she sings and plays the guitar, and is being flanked by four female dancers with tambourines, a drum and a small string instrument, probably a small ukulele accompanied with music from a banjo.

Music video 
A music video was released on 8ball TV's YouTube channel on 5 April 2012, and the video shows Joan Franka recalling memories with the boy that she loved back then. In the video, the young Franka and the boy are shown to be together doing a variety of activities, including reading, skipping together, and Franka giving a kiss to the boy. Throughout the video, Franka is shown to be wearing a Native American headdress. Franka is also shown, all grown up to be frolicking in a forest and playing guitar near a campfire, recalling the memories.

At Eurovision 
In the running order draw, determined on 20 March 2012, Netherlands was drawn to perform third.

During the performance, Franka had a new headdress and wore a long azure dress. Unlike her performance at Nationaal Songfestival, the back-up dancers were replaced by a band consisting of four men playing the guitar, violin, accordion and banjo but the female back-vocalist was still present. The song was slightly altered to include a violin solo after the bridge of the song. Despite the changes, the song finished in 15th place with 35 points and did not advance to the finals. It was the 8th straight year that the Netherlands failed to progress from the semi-finals.

However, if it was up to the public it would have advanced finishing 10th in the televote.

Track listing 
CD single
 "You and Me" – 3:01
 Digital download
 "You and Me" – 3:01

Credits and personnel
 Lead vocals – Joan Franka
 Producers – Joan Franka, Jessica Hoogenboom
 Lyrics – Joan Franka, Jessica Hoogenboom

Chart performance

Peak positions

Year-end charts

Release history

External links 
Website Joan Franka, Songfestival Clips
Music video

References

Eurovision songs of 2012
Eurovision songs of the Netherlands
English-language Dutch songs
2011 songs